Sompot Chong Kben (pha hang) is a unisex, lower body, wraparound cloth worn in the countries of Cambodia, Laos, and Thailand. It is the preferred choice of clothing for women of upper and middle classes for daily wear. Unlike the typical sompot, it is more of a pant than a skirt. The chong kraben is described by art historian Eksuda Singhalampong as "...a garment that resembles loose breeches. The wearer wraps a rectangular piece of cloth around his [or her] waist, the edge of cloth is then passed between the legs and tucked in at the wearer's lower back. Many 19th-century European accounts often called them knee breeches, riding breeches or knickerbockers."

Etymology 
Sompot Chong Kben is a combination of three Khmer words; sampot (a long, rectangular cloth worn around the lower body), chang (to wrap around), and kben (refers to the lower body cloth wrapped around the waist and then pulled back between the legs and tucked in at the back). In short, this type of cloth is known as kben or chong kben, literally means "to wrap or to wear the kben in Khmer language. Whereas chong kraben is used among Thai people and derived from these Khmer words.

History 

The history of sompot chong kben dates back to ancient Cambodia, where deities were often portrayed wearing such styles. Referenced to most Khmer elders told a legend related to this garment. It said that a long time ago, the Khmer people worn sompot chong kben, following the Indian tradition. In those times, India provided many religions, but the most important one was Hinduism, as the Khmer king at that time built the temples such as Angkor Wat, also dedicated to Hinduism. In the era of the Khmer empire, most of the people were likely to read and see The Reamker at the Angkor Wat carving in the first floor as well. The origin of sompot chong kben is known as Indian. Also prayed and blessed to was a deva known as Hanuman, the guard of Prince Rama in India's famous mythology, Ramayana, as well as the Khmer adaptation, Reamker. To show its power, Indians preferred to wear the sompot chong kben as their costume but today, countries under the Greater India, such as Cambodia, also wear it for special occasions.

In Ramayana mythology, Hanuman is a symbol of bravery, cleverness, and power, so the people, when wearing the sompot chong kben, always drop a tail at the back like Hanuman's monkey tail. This practice lead a lot of people to believe that all Indians were guards of Hanuman. The influence of sompot chong kben, known as Dhoti in India, were strongly incorporated into Khmer culture from the ancient times to today. Apparently, this fabric is also known to be worn by Tamil people in south India, as well as Khmer people, till today.] In fact, sompot chong kben is the tradition of southern India, and was imported to early Cambodian Kingdom, Funan by King Kaundinya I.

In the middle of the 13th and 14th centuries, Thai people (from Sukhothai Kingdom, known as Thailand today) and Lao people (from Lan Xang, known as Lao today) had adopted the wearing of sompot chong kben from Khmer. They considered it superior for enjoying the special occasions, and useful for royalty or monarchy in their local royal palace, the Thai people and Lao people had used sompot chong kben in a similar way.

Images

See also
Khmer Traditional Dress
Culture of Cambodia
Culture of Thailand
Dhoti
Sompot
Sarong

References 

Cambodian clothing
Skirts
Trousers and shorts
Folk costumes
Thai clothing